Lymnaea stagnalis, better known as the great pond snail, is a species of large air-breathing freshwater snail, an aquatic pulmonate gastropod mollusk in the family Lymnaeidae. The great pond snail is a model organism to study parasitology, neurology, embryonal development and genetic regulation.

Limnaea stagnalis var. baltica Lindström, 1868: synonym of Lymnaea stagnalis (Linnaeus, 1758)

Distribution
The distribution of this species is holarctic, mainly the temperate zones of Northern America, Europe and Asia. The snail can be found in many ponds, lakes and very slow-moving rivers with a rich underwater vegetation. The northernmost populations exist in northern Norway, and in Central Europe, it inhabits even montane ecosystems at 1700 meters above sea level. In the Saprobiensystem used in Germany to judge the quality of freshwater biotopes, the species has a value of 1.9 and indicates a biotope with a water quality class II, the second-highest.

Shell
For the terms used in this section, see gastropod shell. The shells vary from light brown to dark brown, and the height of an adult shell ranges from 45 to 60 millimeters. Rarely, snails with a 70 mm shell can be found. The width of an adult shell ranges from 20 to 30 mm.

The shell has 4.5 to 6 weakly convex whorls. The upper whorls are pointed, while the last whorl is suddenly inflated. Young great pond snails can be confused with those of the genus Physa, and rarely, in cases of irregularly grown shells, great pond snails can be mixed up with Radix peregra — though adults of the latter species are a lot smaller, with shell heights of only 12 to 20 millimeters.

Nervous system

Lymnaea stagnalis is widely used for the study of learning, memory and neurobiology.

Lymnaea stagnalis has a relatively simple central nervous system (CNS) consisting of a total of ~20,000 neurons, many of them individually identifiable, organized in a ring of interconnected ganglia. Most neurons of the Lymnaea stagnalis central nervous system are large in size (diameter: up to ~100 μm), thus allowing electrophysiological dissection of neuronal networks that has yielded profound insights in the working mechanisms of neuronal networks controlling relatively simple behaviors such as feeding, respiration, locomotion, and reproduction. Studies using the central nervous system of Lymnaea stagnalis as a model organism have also identified novel cellular and molecular mechanisms in neuronal regeneration, synapse formation, synaptic plasticity, learning and memory formation, the neurobiology of development and aging, the modulatory role of neuropeptides, and adaptive responses to hypoxic stress.

Life cycle

Lymnaea stagnalis is a simultaneously hermaphroditic species and can mate in the male and female role, but within one copulation only one sexual role is performed at a time. Lymnaea stagnalis perform more inseminations in larger groups and prefer to inseminate novel over familiar partners. Such higher motivation to copulate when a new partner is encountered is known as the Coolidge effect and has been demonstrated in hermaphrodites firstly in 2007.

Parasites
Lymnaea stagnalis is an intermediate host for:
 Moliniella anceps (Molin, 1859) Hubner, 1939

Other parasites of Lymnaea stagnalis include:
 Echinoparyphium aconiatum
 Echinoparyphium recurvatum
 Opisthioglyphe ranae
 Plagiorchis elegans
 Diplostomum pseudospathaceum
 Echinostoma revolutum
 Trichobilharzia szidati

Lymnaea stagnalis has been experimentally infected with Elaphostrongylus rangiferi.

As aquarium pets 
Lymnaea stagnalis snails can be easily be kept in a freshwater aquarium at room temperature, and fed with various sorts of vegetables, salad, cabbage and dandelion leaves. Fish food will also be eaten, as well as aquarium pests like algae, the Hydra viridissima polyp, and the eggs of other water snails.

Due to the development of toxic nitrates, leftover food must be removed in time, and the water exchanged often. Using a water conditioner is also recommended. Depending on water hardness, a piece of cuttlebone must be offered to cover the snails' calcium needs.

References
This article incorporates CC-BY-2.0 text from references and CC-BY-2.5 text from the reference

External links

 Lymnaea stagnalis at Animalbase taxonomy,short description, distribution, biology,status (threats), images
 Hoffer J. N. A., Ellers J. & Koene J. M. (2010). "Costs of receipt and donation of ejaculates in a simultaneous hermaphrodite". BMC Evolutionary Biology 10: 393. .
 Lymnaea – Scholarpedia article
 https://web.archive.org/web/20090925182719/http://www.lymnaea.org/ – Lymnaea stagnalis Sequencing Consortium
  Arnaud Giusti, Pierre Leprince, Gabriel Mazzucchelli, Jean-Pierre Thomé, Laurent Lagadic, Virginie Ducrot, Célia Joaquim-Justo : Proteomic Analysis of the Reproductive Organs of the Hermaphroditic Gastropod Lymnaea stagnalis Exposed to Different Endocrine Disrupting Chemicals; PLOS|ONE 19 November 2013

Lymnaeidae
Molluscs of Europe
Gastropods described in 1758
Taxa named by Carl Linnaeus